Panaqolus gnomus, sometimes known as the dwarf panaque, is a species of catfish in the family Loricariidae. It is a freshwater fish native to South America, where it occurs in the basins of the Pastaza River and the Marañón River. The species reaches 7.1 cm (2.8 inches) SL. It is the type species of the genus Panaqolus, which was historically considered to be a clade of small-sized species within the genus Panaque, hence the common name of this species.

References 

Ancistrini
Fish described in 1993